Sonora State Highway 162 (Carretera Estatal 162) is a highway in the south of the Mexican state of Sonora.

It runs from Navojoa, where it is named Lázaro Cárdenas Boulevard, to the town of Álamos.

References

162